Ukhov or Uhov is a Russian male surname, its feminine counterpart is Ukhova. It derives from the word ухо (ukho, meaning "ear") and may refer to:

 Ivan Ukhov (born 1986), Russian high jumper
 Vladimir Ukhov (1924–1996), Russian race walker

Russian-language surnames